The 2019 Big Ten softball tournament was held at Andy Mohr Field on the campus of Indiana University in Bloomington, Indiana from May 9 through May 11, 2019. As the tournament winner, Michigan earned the Big Ten Conference's automatic bid to the 2019 NCAA Division I softball tournament. All games of the tournament aired on BTN.

Tournament

Only the top 12 participate in the tournament.

Schedule

References

Big Ten softball tournament
Tournament
Big Ten softball tournament